Sab'ab Atwat ("Seven Gates") is a 1965 autobiographical novel by Moroccan novelist Abdelkrim Ghallab.

References

1965 Moroccan novels